This is a list of schools in Shijingshan District, Beijing.

Secondary schools
Note: In China the word 中学 zhōngxué, literally translated as "middle school", refers to any secondary school and differs from the American usage of the term "middle school" to mean specifically a lower secondary school or junior high school. 初中 chū​zhōng is used to refer to a lower secondary school.

 Beijing Gucheng School (北京市古城中学) - East (东) and West (西) campuses
 Beijing Jingshan School Yuanxiang Branch School (北京景山学校远洋分校)
 Beijing City Jingyuan School (北京市京源学校) - Main School and Lianshuhu Branch School (莲石湖分校)
 Beijing City Lantian No. 1 School (北京市蓝天第一学校)
  (北京市第九中学) - Main School and Branch School (分校)
 Beijing Education Science Research Institute Affiliated Shijingshan Experimental School (北京教育科学研究院附属石景山实验学校) - North Campus (北校区) and South Campus (南校区)
 Beijing City Gaojing High School (北京市高井中学)
 Beijing City Jiahui High School (北京佳汇中学)
 Beijing City Liwen High School (北京市礼文中学)
 Beijing City Tongwen High School (北京市同文中学)
 Beijing City Shijingshan District Hua-Ao School (北京市石景山区华奥学校)
 Beijing City Shijingshan District Huangzhuang School (北京市石景山区黄庄学校)
 Beijing City Shijingshan District Taijing School (北京市石景山区台京学校)
 Beijing City Shijingshan District Zhongshan School (北京市石景山区中杉学校)
 Beijing City Shijingshan District Experimental High School (北京市石景山区实验中学) - Main School, East Campus (东校区). and Branch School (分校)
 Beijing City Shijingshan District Shijingshan High School (北京市石景山区石景山中学)
 High School Affiliated to Beijing Normal University West Beijing Branch School (北京师范大学附属中学京西分校)
 Capital Normal University Affiliated Pingguoyuan High School (首都师范大学附属苹果园中学) - Main School and Branch School (分校)
 North China University of Technology Affiliated High School (北方工业大学附属学校) - Junior High School Division (中学部)
 Affiliated High School of Peking University Shijingshan School (北京大学附属中学石景山学校)
 Shougang Mining Company Workers' Children School (首钢矿业公司职工子弟学校)

Primary schools

References

Shijingshan
Schools